William Augustus Lake (January 6, 1808 – October 15, 1861) was an American lawyer and politician who served one term as  a U.S. Representative from Mississippi from 1855 to 1857.

Biography 
Born near Cambridge, Maryland on January 6, 1808, Lake pursued classical studies and was graduated from Jefferson College, Pennsylvania, in 1827. He served as a member of the Maryland House of Delegates in 1831, after which he moved to Vicksburg, Mississippi. He studied law, was admitted to the bar in 1834 and started practicing in Vicksburg. He served as member of the Mississippi State Senate in 1848.

Congress 
Lake was elected as an American Party candidate to the Thirty-fourth Congress (March 4, 1855 – March 3, 1857). He was an unsuccessful candidate for reelection in 1856 to the Thirty-fifth Congress. He served in the Mississippi House of Representatives from 1859 to 1861, and was its Speaker in the January 1861 session.

Later career and death 
He then resumed the practice of law. He was a candidate for the Confederate Congress in 1861 and, during the canvass was killed in a duel by his opponent, Colonel Chambers, of Mississippi, October 15, 1861, at Hopefield, Arkansas, opposite Memphis, Tennessee. He was interred in the City Cemetery, Vicksburg, Mississippi.

References

1808 births
1861 deaths
19th-century American politicians
American politicians killed in duels
Deaths by firearm in Arkansas
Know-Nothing members of the United States House of Representatives from Mississippi
Members of the United States House of Representatives from Mississippi
Mississippi Know Nothings
People from Dorchester County, Maryland
Members of the Maryland House of Delegates
Speakers of the Mississippi House of Representatives
Mississippi state senators